The Oberoi Group is a luxury hotel group with its head office in New Delhi, India. Founded in 1934, the company owns and operates 32 luxury hotels and two river cruise ships in 7 countries, primarily under its Oberoi Hotels & Resorts and Trident brands. The group also operates The Oberoi Centre for Learning and Development, which is regarded as one of Asia's top institutions for hospitality education.

History 
The foundations of the Oberoi Group date back to 1934 when The Rai Bahadur Mohan Singh Oberoi, the founder of the group, bought two properties: the Maidens in Delhi and the Clarke's in Shimla. In the following years Oberoi, assisted by his two sons, Tilak Raj Singh Oberoi and Prithvi Raj Singh Oberoi (P.R.S. Oberoi), continued the expansion of their group with properties both in India and abroad.

November 2008 terrorist attack 

On 26 November 2008, Trident Mumbai was attacked by 2 terrorists, Fahadullah and Abdul Rehman of Lashkar-e-Taiba  organization as a part of the 2008 Mumbai attacks. 32 staff and guests were killed during the three-day siege.

Ownership 

The two major holding companies of The Oberoi Group are EIH Ltd and EIH Associated Hotels (formerly East India Hotels). P.R.S. Oberoi is the current chairman of The Oberoi Group. His son, Vikramjit Singh Oberoi, and his nephew, Arjun Singh Oberoi serve in the capacities of the Joint Managing Directors at the holding companies.

The Oberoi family is the majority shareholder in EIH Ltd with a 32.11% stake. Cigarettes to Hotels conglomerate, [ITC Limited] owns approximately a 14.98% stake in EIH Ltd. To ward off pressures from ITC Ltd. whose ownership stands precariously close to the automatic open offer trigger at 15%, the Oberoi family divested a 14.12% stake in EIH Ltd. to Mukesh Ambani led Reliance Industries Investment and Holding Pvt Ltd. The stake sale happened on 30 August 2010 for Rs. 1,021 crores valuing EIH Ltd. at an enterprise value of Rs. 7,200 crores. Recently the stake of Reliance further raised from ITC and it stood at 20% overall for Reliance industries.

Hotels 
The company currently manages 32 hotels under the luxury brand Oberoi Hotels & Resorts, with a further 10 five-star properties under the Trident Hotels brand. The group also operates the Clarkes Hotel in Shimla and the Maidens Hotel, Delhi. However, these two properties are not held under the Trident or under the Oberoi brand. The Clarkes Hotel, after remaining temporarily shut following its lawns caving in because of construction in the eco-sensitive vicinity, reopened on 16 September 2012.

Recognitions
The Oberoi Hotels and Resorts group has been voted the world's best hotel brand by readers of the Travel + Leisure travel magazine. Many of the brand hotels have also received a number of awards. Hotels of the Oberoi group have also been ranked amongst the 10 best in the world in Condé Nast Traveler's Readers' Choice Awards. The Oberoi Vanyavilas Ranthambore has been rated the world's best hotel for 2010 by readers of Travel + Leisure.
The Oberoi Udaivilas Udaipur was rated as the world's best hotel in 2015 by Travel + Leisure.

Gallery

References

External links

  

 
Indian companies established in 1934
Companies based in Delhi
Hospitality companies established in 1934
Hospitality companies of India
Indian brands
Luxury brands
Real estate companies established in 1934